Marita Redondo (born February 19, 1956) is an American former tennis player who was active during the 1970s and early 1980s.

Her best singles performance at a Grand Slam tournament was reaching the fourth round at the 1978 US Open where she lost in three sets to Wendy Turnbull. At both the French Open (1976) and Wimbledon (1978) she reached the third round in the singles, losing to Virginia Ruzici and Ruta Gerulaitis respectively.

In 1973, at age 17, she played on the Wightman Cup, an annual women's team tennis competition between the United States and Great Britain, partnering Chris Evert in the first doubles rubber. Redondo played World Team Tennis for the Los Angeles Strings in 1974, the San Diego Friars in 1975 and the Seattle Cascades in 1978.

In January 1978 she won the Avon Futures of San Diego, defeating Pat Medrado in the final in straight sets.	At the Futures Championships in Atlanta in March she was runner-up to Julie Anthony.

Redondo was inducted into the San Diego Tennis Hall of Fame in 2012.

WTA career finals

Singles (1 title)

Doubles (4 titles, 4 runner-ups)

Futures finals

Singles (1 title, 1 runner-up)

References

External links 
 
 

1956 births
Living people
American female tennis players
People from National City, California
21st-century American women
Tennis players from San Diego